Romani dress is the traditional attire of the Romani people, widely known in English by the exonymic slur Gypsies. Romani traditional clothing is closely connected to the history, culture, and national identity of the Roma people.

Certain scholars connect similarities of Romani dress with South Asian populations due to the general consensus of the South Asian origins of Romani people. However, they also note that there are many differences as well, which is indicative of the contact Romani people have had with various other groups. Because of this, Romani dress can vary drastically among different tribes, however, there are certain constant similarities that define Romani dress as a whole. Romani people are often recognizable to other Roma through their appearance and cultural dress codes. Moreover, Romani people value the outwardly display of their wealth and prosperity which is reflective in their traditional dress.

Women's clothing 

The dress of Romani women emphasizes the cultural tradition of displaying your wealth as a sign of good fortune. Romani women tend to wear golden necklaces, bracelets, and headscarves, all of which are often embellished with golden coins. The Diklo is a traditional headscarf worn by married Vlax Romani women.

For the lower body, Romani women traditionally wear skirts. The size of the skirts varies among people of different tribes, ages, and marital status. Traditionally skirts were always worn below the knees as the lower body is considered taboo in Romani culture but, this has changed in modern times. Romani women would also traditionally avoid trousers although this has also changed among the young generation. Additionally, among the Vlax Roma, married women will wear a white apron above their skirt. The apron of a Romani women was in place to protect the food from the dirt of the dress per the cleanliness code of Romani people.

In certain Vlax Romani cultures such as the Gábors, Romani women over the age of 10 are required to wear a dress code that consists of a colourful pleated skirt, colourful blouse with patterns, long pleated apron from the same material as the skirt, and for married women, the kerchief constitute the rule for clothing. Married and young women alike wear a red ribbon in their hair. For footwear, women wear sandals, slippers, boots or shoes. The color of the skirts can reflect a Romani women's status and age with brighter colors being used by younger girls and darker colors by older women. Black skirts are a sign of mourning in the Romani culture.

In the Muslim Roma communities of the Balkans, women of the younger generation tend to wear more conservative Islamic dress while the older generation prefers more traditional dress featuring traditional Roma designs, colors, and symbolism. In Muslim Roma society, the dress code of women is closely monitored and modesty is emphasized especially when it comes to the lower half of the body.

Men's clothing 

Romani men in urban areas tend to wear shiny suits and ties as a display of fashion, status, and elegance. Romani men often wear golden rings and necklaces as jewelry. The hat and vest of a Romani man is indicative of his tribe and clan affiliation. Because of the Romani stigma surrounding the lower body, Romani men will often avoid wearing shorts.

Romani men's clothing was standard throughout their respective clan and the sharing of clothes between clan members was seen as a symbol of brotherhood.

In certain Vlax Romani cultures such as the Gábors, Men are required to wear a dress code consisting of a broad-brimmed hat, loosely fitting black trousers, a dark overcoat and shirt, and a waistcoat with silver buttons. For footwear, men wear black closed shoes.

Persecution 
In many areas to this day, the identification of someone as Roma can have negative consequences. Numerous attempts have been made to assimilate Romani people into European society by minimizing various cultural markers such as clothing. European states have had optional and forced attempts at assimilating or eradicating Romani culture. During the Porajmos and other events of extreme persecution where the identification of Roma could be dangerous, many Romani people had to abandon their cultural dress. However, Romani people continue to resist assimilation to this day despite current efforts by European states to demonize and outlaw Romani culture including Romani dress.

Due to movements such as Bohemianism, many non-Roma people have begun to dress up as Romani people. Helen Graham describes the problematic nature of this trend:

See also 
 Romani society and culture

Gallery

In art

Notes

References

Further reading 
 Gay y Blasco, Paloma. Gypsies in Madrid: Sex, Gender and the Performance of Identity. Oxford: Berg, 1999.
 Sutherland, Anne. Gypsies: The Hidden Americans. Prospect Heights, Ill.: Waveland Press, 1986.
 "Pollution, Boundaries and Beliefs," In Dress and Identity, pp. 436–444. Edited by Roach-Higgens, Mary Ellen, Joanne Eicher and Kim Johnson. New York: Fairchild Publications, 1995.

Folk costumes
Romani culture
Romani society
Clothing by ethnicity